"Juicy" is a song recorded by American singer and rapper Doja Cat. It was included on the deluxe edition of her debut studio album Amala, released on March 1, 2019. A remix version featuring American rapper Tyga was released as the lead single from her second studio album Hot Pink on August 15, 2019. The song was written by Doja Cat, along with Lydia Asrat and producers Yeti Beats & Dr. Luke, under his pseudonym Tyson Trax.

Doja Cat's first song to achieve significant commercial success, "Juicy" has been awarded multiple certifications worldwide, including double platinum in the United States from the Recording Industry Association of America (RIAA) and silver in the United Kingdom from the British Phonographic Industry (BPI).

Background and release 
"Juicy" was written by Doja Cat,David Sprecher and Lukasz Gottwald. The song was produced by Yeti Beats and Lukasz Gottwald, with the latter also co-writing the song under the pseudonym Tyson Trax. The solo version of "Juicy" was initially included as a bonus track on the deluxe edition of Doja Cat's debut studio album, Amala, on March 1, 2019.

Doja Cat stated that she "had a clear picture in her head" of what she wanted the song to be about. "Sometimes, I can see my ass from the front", she told them. "So then I was like, if you can see it from the front, wait until you see it from the back. I thought that was the coolest thing in the world, the greatest hook ever." "Juicy" took less than one day to make. Doja Cat added that she was "proud of it", adding that she "knew people were going to like it, because [she] loved it".

Live performances 
Doja Cat performed the solo version of "Juicy" at the 2020 Billboard Music Awards, as part of a medley which also contained the songs "Like That" and "Say So". At the 2020 AVN Awards, Doja Cat performed "Juicy" along with "Cyber Sex". Doja Cat released two performances for the song to her YouTube channel in December 2020, as well as performances for her songs "Streets" and "Talk Dirty", as a Christmas gift to her fans.

Reception

Critical response 
Czar Van Gaal of V commented on the song, saying that "at first listen it may seem like a catchy song about the female anatomy but underneath the rump referencing rhymes lies a deeper meaning." Gaal added that "'Juicy' is Doja Cat at her finest." Vicky Inoyo of Earmilk called "Juicy" the best track on Amala, adding that the "beauty of the track lies in the lyric writing".

Commercial performance 
In the opening week for the deluxe version of Amala, "Juicy" entered New Zealand's Hot Singles Chart at number 35 as a non-single album track.

Credits and personnel 
Credits adapted from Amala liner notes.

Recording and management
 Engineered and Mixed at eightysevenfourteen studios (Los Angeles, California)
 Mastered at Bernie Grundman Mastering (Hollywood, California)
 Doja Cat Music/Prescription Songs (BMI), Kasz Money Publishing (BMI), Yeti Yeti Yeti Music/WB Music Corp. (ASCAP), Desta Melodies (BMI)

Personnel

Doja Cat – vocals, songwriting
Lukasz Gottwald – songwriting; production , all programming, all instrumentation 
David Sprecher – songwriting, production, all programming, all instrumentation
Lydia Asrat – songwriting
Kalani Thompson – engineering
Seth Ringo – assistant engineering
Tyler Sheppard – assistant engineering
Clint Gibbs – mixing
Danielle Alvarez – production coordination
Mike Bozzi – mastering

Charts

Tyga remix 

A remix of "Juicy" featuring American rapper Tyga was released on August 15, 2019. It is the lead single from Doja Cat's second studio album Hot Pink. It entered charts in the United States, the United Kingdom, New Zealand, and Canada. Tyga is credited as an additional writer on this version.

Critical reception 
Erin Bashford of Clash called the remix of "Juicy" the stand-out track of Hot Pink, remarking that "the song could be near-perfect if it wasn't for Tyga's verse, which feels unnatural". She criticized Tyga's ad-libs. Lucy Shanker of Consequence of Sound marked "Juicy" as one of the essential tracks of Hot Pink.

Live performances 
On November 11, 2019, Doja Cat and Tyga performed the remix of "Juicy" for Late Night with Seth Meyers. The performance features Doja Cat wearing a watermelon unitard and two backup dancers dressed as lemons.

Music video 
The music video for the remix of "Juicy" was released on the same day as the single. A "nod to the vibrant '90s-era music videos like 'Groove Is in the Heart'", it depicts Doja Cat dancing and twerking in multiple fruit-related scenes, while she wears custom fruit-inspired attire, including outfits based on watermelons, bananas, and cherries. The video was directed by Jack Begert. The cherry look for the video was designed by British hat designer Piers Atkinson. The lemon look was made by Bebe Aguirre, along with an accompanying hat for the outfit which was made by JimmyPaul. The grape-inspired look, a "ghost" bikini, was made by clothing designer Laina Rauma. The jacket which accompanies the bikini was made by designer Domminico. The watermelon outfit, a latex suit, was created by Los Angeles based designer Vex Latex. The shoes that accompany the watermelon outfit were made by British shoe designer Kira Goodey.

Soulbounce commented on the music video, saying that the video shows that Cat's "got the plumpest fruit of them all", additionally saying that "you can't deny that the song is quite the jam." Jasmine Hardy of Femestella positively reported on the music video, saying that "[Doja Cat's] care-free confidence and unapologetic attitude when it comes to her natural body are exactly what makes her a standout in the body positive movement."

Commercial performance 
The remix of "Juicy" entered at number 83 on the US Billboard Hot 100, becoming Doja Cat's first entry on the chart. Following the release of Hot Pink, the song re-entered the chart and peaked at number 41. The song debuted at number 88 on the Rolling Stone Top 100 with 28,000 US streaming equivalent units (4.2 million streams). The song was certified two times platinum by the Recording Industry Association of America (RIAA).

Credits and personnel 
Credits adapted from Hot Pink liner notes.

Recording and management
 Engineered and Mixed at eightysevenfourteen studios (Los Angeles, California)
 Tyga Vocals Recorded and Mixed at Nightbird Studios (Los Angeles, California)
 Mastered at Bernie Grundman Mastering (Hollywood, California)
 Doja Cat Music/Prescription Songs (BMI), Kasz Money Publishing (BMI), Yeti Yeti Yeti Music/WB Music Corp. (ASCAP), Desta Melodies (BMI), Tygaman Music/EMI Blackwood Music, Inc. (BMI)

Personnel

Doja Cat – vocals, songwriting
Lukasz Gottwald – songwriting; production , all programming, all instrumentation 
David Sprecher – songwriting, production, all programming, all instrumentation
Lydia Asrat – songwriting
Tyga – vocals, songwriting
Kalani Thompson – engineering
Seth Ringo – assistant engineering
Tyler Sheppard – assistant engineering
Christian "CG" Quinonez – Tyga's vocals recording, Tyga's vocals mixing
Clint Gibbs – mixing
Danielle Alvarez – production coordination
Mike Bozzi – mastering

Charts

Weekly charts

Year-end charts

Certifications

See also 
 Cultural history of the buttocks

References 

2019 singles
2019 songs
Doja Cat songs
Songs written by Dr. Luke
Song recordings produced by Dr. Luke
Songs written by Yeti Beats
Song recordings produced by Yeti Beats
Tyga songs
Songs written by Doja Cat
Kemosabe Records singles
RCA Records singles
Indie pop songs